The Chattanooga Mocs (formerly the Chattanooga Moccasins) are the 16 teams representing the University of Tennessee at Chattanooga in intercollegiate athletics. The Mocs compete in the NCAA Division I Football Championship Subdivision (FCS) and are members of the Southern Conference (SoCon).

Name
Moc is the shortened version of the original nickname, "Moccasins". It also refers to the northern mockingbird, Tennessee's state bird.

Teams 
A member of the Southern Conference, the University of Tennessee at Chattanooga currently sponsors teams in six men's and 10 women's NCAA sanctioned sports.

National championships

Team (4)

References

External links